The Lanchester Valley Railway was an English railway line that was developed by the North Eastern Railway to run between  to . Extending  along the valley of the River Browney, it opened on 1 September 1862. Closed under the Beeching Axe, it has been redeveloped by Durham County Council as a foot and cycle path as the Lanchester Valley Railway Path.

Background
In 1842, the Derwent Iron Company (DIC) had taken over the southern part of the former Stanhope and Tyne Railway. As a result, the DIC proposed an extension from Crook to the foot of the Meeting Slacks incline, which later became , to provide a southern shipping route for their lime and iron products. Having obtained an extension of their right of way from the Bishop of Durham, the DIC submitted the plans to the S&DR, who agreed to the extension as long as the DIC leased the entire southern section of the former S&TR to them.

After the opening of the Weardale Extension Railway and the completion of Hownes Gill Viaduct under Thomas Bouch in 1858, the DIC had pressured the newly formed NER to link  with the River Tyne via Gateshead.

Construction
After the North Eastern Railway (NER) was formed in 1854, they looked for commercially sound new projects within their territory. The proposed Derwent Valley Line would give great commercial value to the DIC, but its potential value to the NER was unknown.

At this time, the NER had only the Leamside Line connecting the two major cities (there was no East Coast Main Line), and so a secondary line seemed promising. Further, it was known that there was coal in the valley of the River Browney, and so developing a railway through it would show speculators that relatively low-cost and reliable transport was easily available. Finally, by the 1860s the DIC needed better access to the iron town of Middlesbrough and the neighbouring ironstone of the Cleveland Hills to feed its furnaces. At this time they were accessed by various circuitous rail links between the two towns, but a direct route was required.

Construction commenced in February 1861 from Durham in the south, with all infrastructure built to double-track standards, but the line was initially built only as a single track. The line opened a year later, with stations at (North to South):

Bridges
At the outbreak of World War I, the bridge was found to be in need of major repairs, and so under instruction from the Ministry of War and with assistance from the army, the NER replaced the structure with an embankment using colliery slag and old ballast.

Operations
In 1870, Lord Lambton accepted an application to search for coal, and the following year it was found. After the agreement of suitable mineral rights leases, the NER in anticipation double-tracked the entire length of the line. Collieries subsequently opened at Bearpark, Malton, Lanchester and Langley Park, all served by the railway.

Passenger numbers were always light on the line, mainly from coal miners taking early morning and late night works trains, and later from workers travelling to Consett.

The line became part of the London and North Eastern Railway during the Grouping of 1923. Passenger numbers fell as the various collieries closed, and the LNER ceased regular passenger services at the outbreak of World War II.

Closure
Occasional excursions to the Durham Miners Gala continued until 1954, after the line had passed to the Eastern Region of British Railways on nationalisation in 1948. Goods traffic to the various stations continued until 1965, but the branch was closed under the Beeching Axe. Consett Steelworks traffic was diverted by British Railways via the former Stanhope and Tyne Railway, allowing the Lanchester Railway to close on 20 June 1966. Contractors removed the track the following year.

Present
Closed under the Beeching Axe, today  has been redeveloped by Durham County Council the Lanchester Valley Railway Path, suitable for walking, cycling and horse riding. At the western end of the path south of Consett, the route links with the Sea to Sea cycle route. The eastern end of the path at Broompark Picnic Area near Stonebridge meets up with the Walney to Wear route. There are many beautiful sites along its route, the ruins of Beaurepaire at Bearpark being one.

See also
List of rail trails

References

External links
Durham CC website

Railway lines opened in 1862
Railway lines closed in 1966
Rail transport in County Durham
Closed railway lines in North East England
North Eastern Railway (UK)
Rail trails in England
1862 establishments in England